is a municipality in the district of Stormarn, in Schleswig-Holstein, Germany. It is situated east of Hamburg on the border of the district of Jenfeld.

Since 1973 the township has consisted of four districts: Barsbüttel (main village), Willinghusen, Stemwarde and Stellau.

Education 
The community contains two elementary schools, one in Barsbüttel and one in Willinghusen. Older students may attend the Erich Kästner Gemeinschaftsschule, which has a bilingual program for students in grades 5 through 10.

The Volkshochshule Barsbüttel offers adult education courses in school and municipal buildings across the four districts.

Twin towns

  Keila, Estonia
  Graal-Müritz, Germany
  Guipavas, France
  Callington, Cornwall, United Kingdom.

Notable people
 Wilhelm Mohnke – Schutzstaffel general, lived here after being released from prison from 1955 to 2001.

References

Stormarn (district)